

Groesfaen Colliery Platform railway station served the workers at Groesfaen Colliery near the town of Bargoed, Caerphilly, Wales on the Brecon and Merthyr Tydfil Junction Railway. The site of the platform does not appear on OS maps and the station was only for workers at the nearby colliery. Nothing remains of the platform or colliery and the station site has since been reused by the A469.

The station was considered for closure before formulation of the Beeching cuts report The Reshaping of British Railways, and was closed before the publication of that report in March 1963.

References

Footnotes

Sources

External links 

Railway stations in Great Britain opened in 1926
Railway stations in Great Britain closed in 1962
1926 establishments in Wales
1962 disestablishments in Wales
Former Great Western Railway stations